Angelina Helen Catherine Cordovano (June 28, 1936 – November 22, 1988), known professionally as Cathy Carr, was an American pop singer.

Career
She was born in The Bronx. As a child, she appeared on The Children's Hour, a television show locally aired in New York; sponsored by Horn & Hardart, a cafeteria chain which had locations in New York and Philadelphia. She later became a singer and dancer with the USO and joined big band orchestras such as those of Sammy Kaye and Johnny Dee.

In 1953 she signed with Coral Records, but had no hits for them, later switching to Fraternity Records, a small company based in Cincinnati, Ohio, in early 1955. It was for Fraternity that she had her only major hit, "Ivory Tower", which was her third record for Fraternity.

She never had another big hit, though in 1959 she had two small successes for Roulette Records. She recorded one single for Smash Records in 1961, which was a more mature song, but went back to recording teenage pop on Laurie Records in 1962. She moved to RCA to record a number of albums of standards, before Laurie released her final single in 1967. Her first LP was reissued on Dot Records in 1966.

At the time of her 1956 hit, she recorded a lot of high school pop, not moving on to more mature songs and standards until her pop career was all but over. The CD age saw an unofficial release of selected singles which showed her preference to seem younger than she was and did not include her attempts at more mature songs.

Death
Carr died from ovarian cancer on November 22, 1988, in Fayetteville, New York.

Albums

Singles

References

Sources
Biography on the Iceberg.com site
Discographical information from Global Dog Productions

1936 births
1988 deaths
Traditional pop music singers
Apex Records artists
Coral Records artists
Dot Records artists
Laurie Records artists
Roulette Records artists
Smash Records artists
20th-century American singers
20th-century American women singers